Disparctia vittata is a moth of the family Erebidae. It was described by Herbert Druce in 1898. It is found in Cameroon, the Democratic Republic of the Congo, Ghana, Kenya, Nigeria, Sierra Leone and Uganda.

The larvae feed on Veronia amygdalina, Cordia abyssinica, Manihot esculentus and Phytolacca dodecandra.

References

Spilosomina
Moths described in 1898
Moths of Africa